The Daniel Jazz can refer to two musical works:
 The Daniel Jazz (1925), an orchestral piece by Louis Gruenberg
 The Daniel Jazz (1963), a short vocal work with music by Herbert Chappell